Al's Big Deal – Unclaimed Freight is a compilation album by American musician Al Kooper. It was released as a double-LP in 1975.

Background
After seven years in the music industry, Columbia Records released a retrospective compilation of Kooper's music from 1968-1975. The two-disc set includes five songs from the first Blood, Sweat and Tears album, Child Is Father to the Man; two from Super Session with Mike Bloomfield and Stephen Stills; a cut from Bob Dylan's New Morning album which Kooper produced and played piano; two cuts from The Live Adventures of Mike Bloomfield and Al Kooper; a long jam with guitarist Shuggie Otis from Kooper Session and six titles from four of his first six solo albums. It does not include any cuts from his 1966 album with The Blues Project. The album was released in the midst of Kooper's involvement with Lynyrd Skynyrd, during which time he did no solo recording. This album was Kooper's last Columbia release until Championship Wrestling in 1982.

Track listing
 "I Can't Quit Her" (Al Kooper, Bob Brass, Irwin Levine) – 3:37
 "I Love You More Than You'll Ever Know" (Kooper) – 5:56
 "My Days Are Numbered" (Kooper) – 3:17
 "Without Her" (Harry Nilsson) – 2:41
 "So Much Love/Underture" (Gerry Goffin, Carole King) – 4:42
 "Albert's Shuffle" (Kooper, Mike Bloomfield) – 6:51
 "Season of the Witch" (Donovan Leitch) – 11:02
 "If Dogs Run Free" (Bob Dylan) – 3:38
 "The 59th Street Bridge Song (Feelin' Groovy)" (Paul Simon) – 5:31
 "The Weight" (Robbie Robertson) – 3:56
 "Bury My Body" (Traditional, arranged by Kooper) – 8:50
 "Jolie" (Kooper) – 3:47
 "I Stand Alone" (Kooper) – 3:37
 "Brand New Day" (Kooper) – 5:08
 "Sam Stone" (John Prine) – 4:41
 "New York City (You're a Woman)" (Kooper) – 5:14
 "I Got a Woman" (Ray Charles, Renald Richard) – 5:11

An alternate listing is presented on the 1989 CD release, with only 14 tracks, in different order and with the notable change of "I Got A Woman" into "The Heart Is a Lonely Hunter", which was released on the 1982 album Championship Wrestling. This release is the same as can be found on streaming services Spotify and Apple Music.
 "New York City (You're a Woman)" - 5:10
 "I Can't Quit Her" - 3:27
 "I Stand Alone" - 3:42
 "Brand New Day" - 5:09
 "The Heart Is a Lonely Hunter" - 4:19
 "Sam Stone" - 4:40
 "Jolie" - 3:45
 "I Love You More Than You'll Ever Know" - 5:54
 "Bury My Body" - 8:46
 "Albert's Shuffle" - 6:54
 "The Weight" - 4:03
 "The 59th Street Bridge Song (Feelin' Groovy) - Live at Bill Graham's Fillmore Auditorium, San Francisco, CA - September 1968" - 5:37
 "If Dogs Run Free" - 3:37
 "Season of the Witch" - 11:09

Notes
The 1989 single-CD version of the album omitted the Blood, Sweat and Tears tracks "My Days Are Numbered", "Without Her", "So Much Love/Underture" and the solo track "I Got a Woman", and added a remixed version of "The Heart Is a Lonely Hunter" from his 1982 album Championship Wrestling. It also contained a completely different track order from the original LP.

Personnel
 Patti Austin - Background vocals
 Barry Bailey - Electric guitar
 Michael Bloomfield - Guitar
 The Blossoms	- Background vocals
 Randy Brecker - Flugelhorn, Horn, Trumpet
 Harvey Brooks - Bass
 Kenny Buttrey -	Drums
 Charles Calello -	Horn Arrangements, String Arrangements
 Fred Catero -	Engineer
 J.R. Cobb -	Guitar
 Bobby Colomby - Drums, Background vocals
 Ron Cornelius - Guitar
 Charlie Daniels - Bass, Guitar
 Dean Daughtry	- Piano
 Bob Dylan	- Acoustic guitar, Vocals
 Emerson-Loew	- Photography
 Hugh Fielder -	Liner Notes
 Jim Fielder -	Bass
 Herbie Flowers -	Bass
 Eileen Gilbert - Background vocals
 Paul Goddard	- Bass
 Barry Goldberg -	 Electric piano
 Al Gorgoni -	Gut-string Guitar
 Dick Halligan -	 Horn, Trombone
 Hilda Harris -	 Background vocals
 "Fast" Eddie Hoh -	Drums
 John Kahn -	Bass
 Steve Katz - Electric guitar
 Wells Kelly -	Drums
 Jerry Kennedy	- Guitar
 Al Kooper -	6-String Bass, Arranger, Guitar, Horn Synthesizer, Keyboards, Mellotron, Organ, Synthesizer Strings, Vibraphone, Vocals
 Russ Kunkel -	Drums
 Tim Langford -	Engineer
 Arthur Levy -	Liner Notes
 Fred Lipsius -	Arranger, Alto Saxophone
 Phil Macy -	Engineer
 Rick Marotta -	Drums
 Jim Marshall -	Photography
 Charlie McCoy -	Harmonica
 Rodney Mills -	Engineer
 Melba Moore -	Background vocals
 Wayne Moss -	Guitar
 Gary Nichamin	- Design, Layout Design
 Robert Nix -	Drums
 Linda November -	 Background vocals
 Shuggie Otis - Guitar
 Roger Pope -	Drums
 Skip Prokop -	Drums
 Don Puluse -	Engineer
 Albertine Robinson -	Background vocals
 Joe Scott -	Horn Arrangements
 Ken Scott -	Unknown Contributor Role
 Roy Segal -	Engineer
 John Simon -	Piano
 Paul Simon -	Vocal Harmony
 Valerie Simpson - Background vocals
 Maretha Stewart - Scat
 Stephen Stills - Guitar
 Tasha Thomas	- Background vocals
 Jerry Weiss -	Flugelhorn, Horn, Trumpet
 Stu Woods -	Bass

References

1975 compilation albums
Al Kooper albums
Columbia Records compilation albums
albums arranged by Charles Calello